Doris Uboh-Ogunkoya (born 16 June 1964) is a Nigerian politician from Ekuku-Agbor Delta state

Career 
Uboh-Ogunkoya represented Ika Federal constituency Delta state from 2007 to 2011

In 2019 she won the All Progressives Congress Senatorial ticket in the primaries to represent Delta North Senatorial District

She also won the primaries under the All Progressives Congress to represent Ika Federal constituency in the 2023 General elections

References 

1964 births
Living people
Delta State politicians